Dr. Hazrat Omar Zakhilwal (born 1968) is an Afghan politician who served as the President's Special Representative and Afghanistan's Ambassador to Pakistan from 2016 until 2018. He also served as Minister of Finance from 2009 to 2015. Since early 2019, Zakhilwal has been a key player in the IntraAfghan Dialogue for peace.

Early life
Zakhilwal was born in 1968 in the Nangarhar Province of Afghanistan. He is believed to be an ethnic Pashtun. In 1984, at the age of 17, Zakhilwal along with his family fled his country among the Afghan refugees and settled in Peshawar, Pakistan. In 1991, he along with the family immigrated to Canada.

Education and academics
Zakhilwal obtained his bachelor's degree in economics at the University of Winnipeg in Manitoba, Canada in 1994. He then moved to Kingston, Ontario, where he earned a master's degree in economics at Queen's University in 1995. Soon after, he was hired by Statistics Canada in Ottawa, where he completed a doctorate in economics at Carleton University. He graduated in 2001.

Zakhilwal published numerous articles and research papers on political, economic and social issues related to Afghanistan for newspapers, magazines and journals such as the New York Times, Washington Post, Wall Street Journal, Ottawa Citizen, Wahdat, Forum of Federation Quarterly, Human Rights Tribune, Al-Ehram, Afghan Post, Heela, Dawat, Mujahid Wolus, Afghan Mosaic, and Afghan Mirror. His work is in English, Pashto and Dari, and some of his articles are available on the internet.

Politics

Over the course of his stay in Afghanistan, Zakhilwal has been part of the 2002 and 2003 loya jirgas. He served as an author of Afghanistan's First National Human Development Report, which was released by the United Nations Development Programme (UNDP) in February 2007 and won the UN special award for best analysis in June 2007.

He also worked as an Afghan counterpart to the North-South Institute-led "What Kind of Peace is Possible?" research project, examining the role of community-led development in sustainable peace-building, as well as working on a strategy for Counter-Narcotics Alternative Livelihood in Afghanistan. He has done consulting work for the World Bank, UNDP, CIDA, and other organisation.

Zakhilwal served as the President of the Afghanistan Investment Support Agency (AISA), a member of the Supreme Council of Da Afghanistan Bank, Acting Minister of Transport and Civil Aviation, and the Chief Advisor to the Minister of Rural Development of Afghanistan. He became the Chief Economic Advisor to President Hamid Karzai in July 2008, and in March 2009 he was chosen as the new Minister of Finance.
 
He served as Afghan Ambassador to Pakistan until November 2018. After the 2021 Taliban takeover, he remained in Kabul, giving limited advisory activities to the new Taliban government.

Awards 
Zakhiwal was honoured twice with highest government award, the Wazir Akbar Khan medal for recognition of his services from President Hamid Karzai and President Ashraf Ghani.

Work history

References

External links 

 Biography of Omar Zakhilwal

1968 births
Afghan cricket administrators
Ambassadors of Afghanistan to Pakistan
Finance Ministers of Afghanistan
Living people
Pashtun people
Afghan emigrants to Canada
Afghan expatriates in Pakistan
People from Badakhshan Province